George Boxwell is a former Canadian international lawn bowler.

He won a silver medal for Canada when he was part of the pairs team at the 1990 Commonwealth Games in Auckland, New Zealand. His pairs partner was Alf Wallace.

He is a four times national champion spanning from 1977 to 1988.

References

Living people
Canadian male bowls players
Commonwealth Games medallists in lawn bowls
Commonwealth Games silver medallists for Canada
Bowls players at the 1990 Commonwealth Games
Year of birth missing (living people)
Medallists at the 1990 Commonwealth Games